The 1896–97 Football Tournament was the 8th staging of The Football Tournament.

Overview
It was contested by 5 teams, and Kjøbenhavns Boldklub won the championship for the second time in their history.

League standings

References

External links
RSSSF

1896–97 in Danish football
Top level Danish football league seasons
The Football Tournament seasons
Denmark